Ndzinisa is an African surname. Notable people with the surname include:

Phumlile Ndzinisa (born 1992), Swazi runner
Sabelo Ndzinisa (born 1991), Swazi football player

Bantu-language surnames